SS Sir William Siemens was a steel-hulled American lake freighter in service between 1896 and 1944. Built in 1896 by the Globe Iron Works Company of Cleveland for John D. Rockefeller's Bessemer Steamship Company, she was the third of three  lake freighters, each of which shared the unofficial title of Queen of the Lakes due to their record-breaking length.

Built for use in the iron ore trade, she made her maiden voyage on August 25, 1896. In 1901, the Bessemer fleet merged into the Pittsburgh Steamship Company. Sir William Siemens was sold to the J. A. Paisley Steamship Company, and was renamed William B. Pilkey. She was sold to the Columbia Transportation Company in 1935, and was renamed Frank E. Vigor in 1941.

On the morning of April 27, 1944, Frank E. Vigor was traveling on Lake Erie in a thick fog with a cargo of sulphur. While transiting the Pelee Passage, she collided with the freighter Philip Minch. Frank E. Vigor was badly damaged below the waterline, and quickly began to list. Her entire crew was rescued by Philip Minch.

History

Background
In 1843, the gunship USS Michigan, built in Erie, Pennsylvania, became the first iron-hulled vessel built on the Great Lakes. In the mid-1840s, Canadian companies began importing iron vessels prefabricated by shipyards in the United Kingdom. Merchant, the first iron-hulled merchant ship constructed on the Great Lakes, was built in 1862. Despite the success of Merchant, wooden vessels remained preferable to iron ones until the 1880s, due to their inexpensiveness and the abundance of timber. In the early 1880s, shipyards around the Great Lakes began to construct iron ships on a relatively large scale. In 1884, the first steel freighters were built on the Great Lakes. By the 1890s, the majority of ships constructed on the lakes were made of steel. The late 19th and early 20th centuries saw a rapid increase in the size of lake freighters; the first  freighter was built in 1895 and the first  freighter was constructed five years later.

Throughout the 1880s, the iron ore trade on the Great Lakes grew exponentially, primarily due to the increasing size of the lake freighters, and the rise in the number of trips made by ore boats to the ore docks of Lake Superior. As the railways were unable to keep up with the rapid production of iron ore, most of it was transported by bulk freighters.

Design and construction

Sir William Siemens (US official number 116732) was built in Cleveland, Ohio, in 1896 by the Globe Iron Works Company. Her construction was delayed by a strike at the shipyard after the launching of her sister ship Sir Henry Bessemer on May 9. She was completed on July 15, and was launched on July 25, 1896, as hull number 67. Sir William Siemens was built for John D. Rockefeller's Bessemer Steamship Company of Cleveland, and was named after German-British inventor Carl Wilhelm Siemens. Sir William Siemens was one of the largest ships on the Great Lakes at the time of her construction, earning her the unofficial title Queen of the Lakes, which she shared with her sister ship Sir Henry Bessemer and the M. A. Hanna & Company's freighter Coralia. They were surpassed in length on August 1, 1896, by the  Sir William Fairbairn.

The cargo hold hold of Sir William Siemens was reminiscent of those found on older wooden lake freighters; between 1882 and 1904, the cargo holds of all iron and steel freighters contained stanchions and steel angles which were the equivalent of the knees used on wooden freighters. The hold was divided into four separate compartments by three screen bulkheads which stretched to the spar deck, and was accessed via twelve  hatches located on  centers. Sir William Siemens pilothouse was located behind her forecastle. She also had a deckhouse on her aft spar deck, which contained a galley and dining rooms; accommodations for her crew were housed in the aft deckhouse and forecastle. Her electric lighting system was manufactured by the General Electric Company of Schenectady, New York.

She had a gross register tonnage of 4344 tons, and a net register tonnage of 3293 tons.

The engine and boilers were both built by the Globe Iron Works Company.

Service history
On August 13, 1896, the Cleveland based newspaper, The Marine Record, reported that she would probably be delivered to her owners on August 25, 1896. Inland Lloyd's valued her at $240,000 (equivalent to $ in ) and gave her an insurance rating of A1; her home port was Duluth, Minnesota. She was struck by the monitor Andaste while still at the Globe Iron Works Company on the evening on August 20; Sir William Siemens was repaired at a cost $1,500 (equivalent to $ in ). Her maiden voyage began when, following a short trial trip, she left Cleveland at night on August 25, passing Detroit, Michigan, after an eight hours at 8:00a.m.; The Marine Record described her speed as "very unusual for a ship with brand new machinery".

In August that same year, she was warned for violating the rules of the St. Marys River. She struck an obstruction at the north end of Bois Blanc Island near Amherstburg, Ontario, in September 1897. On July 4, 1899, Sir William Siemens struck the wall of the Poe Lock due to a misunderstanding of signals, taking a large piece out of it; she reportedly sustained no damage in the incident.

On July 21, 1900, Sir William Siemens loaded 225,000 bushels of corn in South Chicago, Illinois, which was, at the time, one of the largest cargoes of grain taken out of that port.

In 1901, the Bessemer fleet merged into the Pittsburgh Steamship Company. Sir William Siemens was sold to the J. A. Paisley Steamship Company, and was renamed William B. Pilkey. She was sold to the Columbia Transportation Company in 1935, and was renamed Frank E. Vigor in 1941.

Final voyage

On the morning of April 27, 1944, Frank E. Vigor was traveling on Lake Erie with a cargo of sulphur. While transiting the Pelee Passage in a thick fog, she collided with the freighter Philip Minch. The Vigor was badly damaged below the waterline, and quickly began to list. Her entire crew was rescued by the Minch, but she eventually capsized and sank.

Notes

References

Sources

External links

1896 ships
Ships built in Cleveland
Great Lakes freighters
Merchant ships of the United States
Shipwrecks of the Ontario coast
Shipwrecks of Lake Erie
Wreck diving sites